The 2008 Price LeBlanc Lexus Pro Tennis Classic was a 2008 ATP Challenger Series event. It took place in Baton Rouge, Louisiana, from April 21 to April 27.

Champions

Singles

 Bobby Reynolds def.  Igor Kunitsyn 6–3, 6–7(3), 7–5

Doubles
 Phillip Simmonds /  Tim Smyczek def.  Ryan Harrison /  Michael Venus 2–6, 6–1, [10–4]

2008 ATP Challenger Series
2008 in American tennis
2008 Price LeBlanc Lexus Pro Tennis Classic
2008 in sports in Louisiana
2008